The 2019 Canadian Soccer League season was the 22nd season under the Canadian Soccer League name. The season started on May 19, 2019, and concluded on October 26, 2019, with the CSL Championship final. Fixtures for the 2019 season were announced on April 30, 2019. The final consisted of Scarborough SC defeating FC Ukraine United at Centennial Park Stadium in Toronto, Ontario to claim their first championship title. The First Division title went to FC Vorkuta along with the Second Division title, and championship. The single new addition to the First Division was Kingsman SC, and the departures occurred in the Second Division with Halton United, London City, and Milton SC becoming founding members of the Canadian Academy of Soccer League (CASL).

Summary 
Scarborough SC was the highlight of the season as they claimed their first CSL Championship after two previous consecutive attempts at the title. Throughout the regular season, the eastern Toronto team were the consistent challengers to Vorkuta and finished as runners-up in the First Division. They retained the services of Zoran Rajović as head coach and continued in the status quo of acquiring imports in maintaining competitiveness with the major clubs. 

FC Vorkuta continued in their standard of recruiting talent from the Ukraine, and as a result achieved a league milestone of three titles (First & Second division titles, and the DII Championship). The club became the fourth club in CSL history after York Region Shooters in the 2014 season to achieve an undefeated regular season.  A surprising early defeat to Kingsman SC in the early round of the postseason eliminated their chance of acquiring a perfect season. Only the Toronto Olympians and York Region Shooters accomplished this feat in the top division.   

The third position in the First Division was primarily contested between FC Ukraine United, SC Waterloo Region, and Serbian White Eagles. The White Eagles held the position for fourteen weeks straight before relinquishing in the final three weeks to SC Waterloo and ultimately to Ukraine United. The Etobicoke-based team experienced a tumultuous season as general manager Vladimir Koval, and newly appointed head coach Mykhailo Hurka struggled in coordinating the usage of import players as they were fulfilling their commitments in Europe. Injuries were also a factor in the team's performance, but late in the season, the club acquired several new players with Molham Babouli being the most notable domestic acquisition. As a result, Ukraine United secured third place in the division and reached the championship final.       

SC Waterloo, and Serbian White Eagles both strengthened their core veteran squad with additional imports from the Western Balkans. Throughout the majority of the season, the White Eagles held the third position, but a series of defeats late in the season allowed Waterloo to briefly secure the position until finishing fourth with a higher differential in scoring. Waterloo managed to hold the highly contested third position from Serbia three times throughout the season, and after winning six of its last seven games usurped the position permanently until the final match of the season with Ukraine United firmly securing the spot. Both Waterloo, and Serbia competed in the postseason with the former reaching the second round, and the latter facing an earlier departure in the first round respectively.        

The final three playoff berths contended among CSC Mississauga, Hamilton City SC, and Kingsman SC. Kingsman SC an expansion franchise held the sixth position for the majority of the season and enjoyed the benefit of acquiring seasoned imports from FC Vorkuta. After battling Kingsman for the sixth position Hamilton managed to steal the spot in the final stages of the regular season campaign. The town north of Vaughan accomplished a major upset in the postseason after handing Vorkuta its first defeat of the season. Subsequently, Kingsman was eliminated in the second round to Scarborough. CSC Mississauga continued its focus on player development but followed the standard of the league's dominant clubs by attracting some foreign talent to remain competitive. Its efforts were effective as the franchise secured its first playoff berth by finishing seventh with a higher goal differential from Kingsman.            

While the two remaining clubs were Brantford Galaxy, and SC Real Mississauga finishing in the tenth, and ninth positions. Brantford retained their veterans for the season, but struggled in making an impact and primarily was situated at the bottom of the standings the entire season. Real Mississauga produced a similar result as Brantford finishing just three points ahead in the standings.

First Division

Changes from 2018 
During the off-season former SC Toronto founder and league equity owner Isac Cambas died on March 1, 2019, from cancer. The season commenced with all nine teams from the 2018 season returning with the approval of a single expansion team from five applicants. The changes confirmed at the 2019 annual general meeting of team owners was the introduction of professional soccer to King, Ontario with Kingsman SC fielding teams in the First & Second divisions. Originally the league released a press release announcing the return of professional soccer to Niagara Falls, Ontario under the name Niagara FC with former league veteran Timotej Zakrajsek, and Tamara Samardzija as the driving forces behind the bid. Unfortunately, the project failed to materialize as the club didn't make its debut.   

Changes occurred in the CSL executive committee and staff with Serbian White Eagles president Dragan Bakoc serving as the league's president. Meanwhile, the Second Division fielded six teams for the 2019 season. Several departing clubs became founding members of the Canadian Academy of Soccer League (CASL) a new professional league centered in Milton, Ontario, with Milton SC owner Jasmin Halkic initiating the operation along with the additions of Halton United, and London City.

Teams

Standings

Positions by round

Playoffs

Quarterfinals

Semifinals

Finals

Season statistics

Goals

Updated: October 7, 2019

Hat-tricks

Second Division  
The Second Division remained the same as the previous season with six teams. The new additions were the reserve teams of CSC Mississauga, Hamilton City SC, and Kingsman SC. The departing clubs were Halton United, London City, and Milton SC to become inaugural members of the Canadian Academy of Soccer League (CASL), thus making the Second Division primarily a reserve division for its senior clubs. FC Vorkuta B successfully defended its championship and division title for the second consecutive season.

Teams

Standings

Positions by round

Playoffs

Quarterfinals

Semifinals

Finals

Top Goal Scorers

Updated: October 4, 2019
Source:

References 

Canadian Soccer League (1998–present) seasons
2019 domestic association football leagues
Canadian Soccer League